Connect is a new social network analysis software data mining computer system developed by HMRC (UK) that cross-references business's and people's tax records with other databases to establish fraudulent or undisclosed (misdirected) activity.

History
HMRC introduced Connect in the summer of 2010; it was not fully functioning. Around 350 HMRC employees are involved with Connect, who work with an analytical compliance environment. Connect was developed by BAE Systems Applied Intelligence (former Detica in Surrey) for £45m.

From September 2016, Connect has interfaced with financial information from British Overseas Territories; these have been known tax havens. From 2017 Connect has interfaced with around sixty other OECD countries.

Sources of information
Connect cross-references information from many other UK government databases, including:
 Adverts on the internet e.g. Rightmove and Zoopla
 Bank accounts and pensions
 Council tax
 Credit and debit card transactions, going back four years
 Companies House
 DVLA
 DWP (former Benefits Agency)
 eBay and other internet marketplaces
 The electoral roll
 Gas Safe Register
 Insurance companies
 Land Registry - for capital gains tax

HMRC also independently looks at Google Earth.

Technology
The system deploys the chi-squared test and Benford's law to look for anomalous tax receipts. The system is operated by the Risk and Intelligence Service (RIS) division of HMRC. The software combines analytic tools (Enterprise Guide) from SAS Institute, which collects the information, and NetReveal from BAE Systems AI, which collates it into meaningful information.

It deploys predictive analytics similar to credit scoring, and has dynamic benchmarking. It looks for correlation of income with lifestyle, by comparing with multivariate statistical models; outliers from expected variance will be investigated.

Definition of data
Undeclared work is plotted on mapping software, allowing undeclared work to be seen at a street by street level.

Purpose
Connect looks for income disparities, often caused by undeclared income. If someone drives an expensive car, but does not have the income to run one or afford one, Connect can discover this.

See also
 Mosaic (geodemography)
 National Border Targeting Centre, UK Government computing centre in south Manchester that traces illegal and suspicious immigration into the UK, via cross-border databases
 Government Connect, part of Government Secure Intranet, a computer communications systems between UK local authorities
 Tax information exchange agreement

References

External links
 Telegraph: "Connect computer system" (June 2015)
 HMRC Digital blog
 SAS Enterprise Guide
 BAE Systems.com: Financial Crime

BAE Systems
Big data products
Computer-related introductions in 2010
Corruption in the United Kingdom
Data analysis software
Fraud in the United Kingdom
Geodemographic databases
Geographical databases in the United Kingdom
Government databases in the United Kingdom
HM Revenue and Customs
Informal economy
Postcodes in the United Kingdom
Social network analysis software
2010 software
2010 establishments in the United Kingdom
Tax avoidance in the United Kingdom
Tax evasion in the United Kingdom